Several places claim to be the largest village in England. This title is disputed as there is no standard definition of a village as distinct from a town and 'largest' can refer to population or area.

A typical contender is Lancing in West Sussex with a population of around 19,000.  Whilst Lancing might be described as a town in everyday use, it has not formally taken on this status and, in this case with three tiers of local government, it has a parish council rather than a town council. Also, it has a village hall instead of a town hall. All claimants must avoid having had a town charter or licence to hold a market from the Crown.  Many other villages are in a similar position. Some of the claimants below, such as Cottingham, Great Baddow, Lancing and Rawmarsh, are part of larger urban areas and it can be contended that such claimants are suburbs or 'suburban villages' rather than 'standalone villages' which have a clear surrounding open space buffer zone.

The old simple definitions of a town is a settlement with:
town charters (see the list of towns in England); or 
with a regular market.

These two features have been long surpassed by large 'new towns' on former villages such as Harlow which have neither feature yet have virtually no claims that they are villages.

The claim is therefore complicated by disputes over what renders a village a town, the usual trichotomy in current use of British English being village, town or city.

Typical factors
Definitions can refer to history of population growth or popular formulae based on types and quantities of key buildings (e.g. schools, retailers, railway/tram station, more than one church or community hall), limited business parks and maximum limits to the density of housing.  The few large dispersed settlements, historically tied to one church community, and major changes to boundaries allow more elaborate claims.  A third common criterion is simply stating it is a 'village' in a nameplate or whole community organisation, which leads to city district such as Blackheath, London having a strong claim.

Impact of postal towns and boroughs
The country is split up into postal towns: settlements from village to city scale that can contrast markedly, but are carefully cited by some village contenders to rule out other villages. Others point to the fact that a rival village is in a borough.

Parish criterion
The typical English local government district contains a variety of settlements and, while planning law encourages the existence of buffers, the term village has no formal use and wards are not permanently fixed.  Civil parishes exist in many such districts to add an extra rung to local government, with fewer major changes – they can contain divorced villages, neighbourhoods hamlets, often based on old ties to what was one community, an ecclesiastical parish which may be lost, such as by the building of a motorway.

Popular definitions and changes
Popularly, many settlements are described both as a town and a village by different people and/or can change over small areas.  For example, Hebden Bridge in West Yorkshire is widely considered a "town" yet its population is half that of Birstall in the same county, most organisations of which and writers about which describe it as a village.

Furthermore, settlements have a tendency to become denser and/or expand wider and, when they do, many residents may prefer to think of their home as a village rather than a town, and institutions such as a village green or village hall will tend to retain the name that they were given when the settlement was smaller. Since 1974, separation of rural settlements from urban settlements has not been important for local authorities themselves, and became less so with the new top-level authorities created that year e.g. Bessacarr, South Yorkshire was not part of the town of Doncaster before 1974; it is often spoken of as a suburb of Doncaster now, but, where described as a village today, then it was a ward with Cantley having 14,408 people in 2011.

Consensus
Such difficulties in measurement, and desires for different organisations to be called a town or a village, mean that the media has been free to pick whichever criteria it sees fit when choosing whether to describe a settlement as a town or a village.

Contenders
Places for which this claim has been made, and the reported population in the 2011 census (most recent all households census) include:

References

External links
 UK government definition of rural and urban areas

Largest
Villages